Code page 1057, HP PC-8, is a character encoding specified by IBM. It is a close derivation of Code page 437.

Codepage layout

Characters are shown with their equivalent Unicode codes.

References

1057